The Rat Terrier is an American dog breed with a background as a farm dog and hunting companion. They share much ancestry with the small hunting dogs known as feists. Common throughout family farms in the 1920s and 1930s, they are now recognized by the United and American Kennel Clubs and are considered a rare breed.  Rat Terrier are an intelligent and active breed that can be kept both for pest control and as a family pet.

Description

Appearance
The miniature size and under as defined by the UKChas become more popular as a house pet and companion dog, but the miniature is still a hunting dog. The standard says "small to medium"  and the miniature is small enough to go in and under those places where vermin like to hide. Called the Decker or Decker Giant, it was named after breeder Milton Decker who created a larger hunting companion and are recognized by the National Rat Terrier Association (NRTA, see "Breed recognition" below). UKC and AKC do not recognize the Decker strain as another breed; they are merely considered a standard variety. The NRTA recognizes a Toy variety weighing  or less. The NRTA continues to classify the Teddy Roosevelt Terrier as the Type B Rat Terrier. In the 1970s, a hairless mutation appeared in a single Rat Terrier and was propagated into a strain of the Rat Terrier. After a period of development this line resulted in the American Hairless Terrier, recognized as a separate breed by several registries.

The Rat Terrier comes in a variety of coat colors. The classic coloring is black tan point with piebald spotting (known as black tricolor), but chocolate, tan (varying in shade from pale gold to dark mahogany), blue, isabella (pearl), lemon, and apricot are all fairly common. They may be tricolor or bicolor, always with some amount of white present. Sable may overlay any of these colors. Creeping tan (often "Calico"), is also acceptable. Ticking is usually visible in the white parts of the coat, or in the underlying skin. Brindle, currently disallowed by the main breed standards, is considered by some to be a traditional Rat Terrier pattern, and there is a growing movement to have this pattern accepted into the breed. However, merle is widely considered to be the result of recent outcrosses and, because of associated health problems, is rejected by most Rat Terrier breeders. 

Ear carriage is erect, but can also be tipped, or button, all of which contribute to an intelligent, alert expression. Today, some breeders prefer a natural, undocked tail, which is accepted in the breed standards.

Rat Terriers tend to be both intelligent and stubborn, knowing how to get what they want when they want it. They are also considered good family pets because of their energy and compatibility with kids. They are playful and require much exercise.

Temperament

The social sensitivity of Rat Terriers makes them very trainable and easier to live with for the average pet owner, but it also means that extensive socialization from an early age is critical. Proper socialization of a Rat Terrier puppy includes exposing the animal to a wide variety of people and places, particularly during the first three months of life. Like most active and intelligent breeds, Rat Terriers tend to be happier when they receive a great deal of mental stimulation and exercise. Rat terriers are usually loyal to their owners and are very respectful if they receive the proper amount of training at a young age.

Health

Due to regular outcrossings throughout the Rat Terrier's history, overall it is a very hardy breed. However, with its growth in popularity in recent years some issues are becoming more common. The Canine Health Information Center (CHIC) recommends that Rat Terriers be tested for patellar luxation, cardiac abnormalities, pancreatic issues, hip dysplasia, and Legg–Calvé–Perthes syndrome. The average lifespan of a well-bred Rat Terrier is 16–19 years.

History
The earliest known record of a rat-catching dog is that of "Hatch", whose remains were recovered from the Mary Rose, the flagship of Henry VIII, sunk in 1545 and re-raised in 1982. Hatch is thought to have been a mongrel, and was brought on board to control the rat population.
 
The breed name comes from the occupation of its earliest ancestors brought to the US by working-class British migrants as the dogs were used in rat-baiting. However they were, for the most part, bred for speed. Their speed is used for controlling vermin and hunting small game such as squirrels and hares. After the 1890s, as the breed type became popular in the United States, they were bred with Beagles, Italian Greyhounds, and Manchester Terriers. Many of the foundation Rat Terriers were indistinguishable from small mixed-breed hunting dogs known as "feists". The smaller varieties diverged from the Rat Terrier line very early on, with UKC registration for the Toy Fox Terrier beginning in 1936.

Rat Terriers were cherished as loyal hunting companions and efficient killers of vermin on 20th-century American farms: as a result, they were one of the most popular dog types from the 1920s to the 1940s. However the widespread use of chemical pesticides and the growth of commercial farming led to a sharp decline in the breed from the 1950s onwards. Breed loyalists maintained the bloodline, leading to the modern Rat Terrier.

The genetic diversity of the Rat Terrier has contributed to the overall health, keen intelligence, and soundness of the breed. Most modern breeds were developed from a few founding dogs and then propagated from a closed gene pool. In contrast, the Rat Terrier has benefited from a long history of refinement with regular outcrosses to bring in useful qualities and genetic variability.

In the current times, the Rat Terrier is becoming popular not only as a family pet but as a working dog in several fields.

Their affectionate and calm temperament along with small size has made them popular as service dogs in hospice, treatment for depression, in Assisted Living, and other human-care jobs.

Police departments have started using them as contraband search dogs as their intelligence level shortens training to as little as three weeks which is much shorter than for traditional police service breeds.  Also, their small size allows search of cars, homes, and prison cells without causing the major damage a large German Shepherd or other traditional police service breed would do during a car search and lessening the chances of major financial settlements if there is nothing found during a search.

One source claims that a single terrier killed 2,501 rats in a seven-hour period in a rat-infested barn (an average of one rat every ten seconds).

Breed recognition
Rat Terrier organizations exhibit the typical disputes over the course of action to be taken for the promotion and preservation of the breed. As usual among working breeds, points of departure are which dog type best represents the breed and whether the dog's working qualities will be sacrificed to selection for conformation show competition.

The Rat Terrier Club of America is the official breed parent club for the American Kennel Club.  Rat Terriers were accepted into the AKC's terrier group June 2012.  Rat terriers have been competing in the United Kennel Club events for over 15 years. UKC is a family-friendly group that promotes many different venues for dogs to compete. The National Rat Terrier Association is the largest independent registry and has maintained lineage records for decades. Feeling the working terrier nature of the breed will suffer, it is the most prominent of those clubs and associations opposed to Kennel Club closed-registry breeding rules.

The Decker Hunting Terrier Registry was created specifically for the Decker Giant. This registry's mission is to keep all the qualities that set the Decker aside from the standard Rat Terrier, while retaining and improving upon the hunting ability.

The UKC officially recognized the breed on January 1, 1999. The AKC recognized the Rat Terrier as a breed on July 1, 2010, however, it allowed them to compete in companion events beginning January 1, 2006 in sanctioned AKC Companion events (Obedience, Agility, Rally). The first Rat Terrier to earn a title under AKC Sanctioning was in Agility on January 14, 2006 in Van Nuys, California by Harpur's Giddy Upp "Gigi" and D. Davidson Harpur. AKC accepted the Rat Terrier into the Terrier Group in June 2012. The first AKC Champion Rat Terrier was "Annie"  GCH GRCH King Pen RnB's Queen Ann bred, owned by Sherry & Dud Lee Hendrix of Modesto, California.

See also
 
 List of dog breeds

References

External links

 Rat Terrier Club of America (AKC Parent Club)
 Universal Kennel Club International 
 National Rat Terrier Club and Registry 
 United Kennel Club
 American Kennel Club

Terriers
Dog breeds originating in the United States